Highway 392 (also called AR 392 and Hwy. 392) is a  state highway in the Ozark Mountains in northern Arkansas. The highway runs from U.S. Highway 62 (US 62) and US 412 in Little Arkansaw east to AR 7 in Harrison. The route is located entirely in Boone County, and also serves the communities of Batavia and Capps. AR 392 is maintained by the Arkansas Department of Transportation.

The highway is included in the Arkansas Heritage Trails System; designated as part of the Trail of Tears (Benge Route).

Route description

From here the route heads south, leaving Little Arkansaw and heading through a rural area. The highway turns southeast to pass through Batavia; past the community, it briefly heads south before turning eastward. After passing through Capps, the road crosses the Dry Jordan Creek before meeting northbound AR 397. The two highways are briefly concurrent before AR 397 turns south; AR 392 continues eastward toward Harrison as Capps Road. In Harrison, the route enters a residential area before curving southeast toward Stephenson Avenue. It follows Stephenson Avenue east for two blocks before turning south into a business district on Pine Street. After following Pine Street for a block, the route terminates at AR 7.

History
Present-day Highway 329 was created as a state highway on April 24, 1963, as Highway 206 between US 62 and Capps as part of a large addition mileage to the state highway system. The designation was extended along a county road to Highway 7 in Harrison two years later. Following construction in Harrison, Highway 206 was extended one block along Pine Street to a relocated Highway 7 (Central Avenue) in 1967.

With three Highway 206 designations in Boone County, local leaders asked the Arkansas State Highway Commission to renumber one segment to reduce confusion. The Highway Commission renumbered the segment from Little Arkansaw and Harrison to Highway 392 on June 27, 1990.

Major intersections

See also

References

Sources

External links

Arkansas Heritage Trails System
392
Transportation in Boone County, Arkansas